Spout Lake Water Aerodrome  is located on Spout Lake, British Columbia, Canada.

References

Seaplane bases in British Columbia
Cariboo Regional District
Registered aerodromes in British Columbia